The Last Stop is a 2012 Brazilian-Lebanese drama film directed by Marcio Cury. It was screened at the 45th Festival de Brasília, the 36th São Paulo International Film Festival, the 35th Cairo International Film Festival and the 16th Cine Las Americas International Film Festival in Austin, Texas.

The film follows the story of a Lebanese boy that is forced to leave his homeland, involved in a war that erupted in the Middle East, and migrate with the family to Brazil.

Plot
The Lebanese teenager Tarik leaves his hometown in search of a better life in Brazil. On the journey by ship, he befriended other young Arabs and Syrians, but when they reached the country, each went to a different way. After 50 years, Tarik, with the help of his daughter, resolves to find the friends of the trip.

Cast

Mounir Maasri as Tarik
Elisa Lucinda as Ciça
Klarah Lobato as Samia
João Antônio as Karim
Edgard Navarro as Joseph
Narciza Leão as Mouna
Iberê Cavalcanti as Mohamad
Adriano Siri as Hassan
José Charbel as Hanna
Chico Sant'anna as Ali
Sérgio Fidalgo as Mustafa
Roula Hamadeh as Mother (Najla)
Claude Khalil as Postman
Estephan Ghassan as Father
Adriano Barroso as Ribeirinho Porto de Belém
Ghassan Estefan as Father
Sergio Fidalgo as Mustafa

Production
The screenwriter Di Moretti interviewed ten Lebanese families as a source of research for the film. With three of them he did more in-depth interviews, in order to learn more about the Lebanese culture.

According to Moretti, there were two versions of the screenplay: one to be entirely filmed in Brazil and another with scenes to be shot in Lebanese territory. The second version was used in the film.

References

External links
 

2012 films
2012 drama films
Brazilian drama films
2010s Arabic-language films
2010s Portuguese-language films
Films about immigration
Films shot in Lebanon
Films shot in Paulínia
Lebanese drama films
2012 multilingual films
Brazilian multilingual films
Lebanese multilingual films